The 2021 UCI Women's World Tour was a competition that included eighteen road cycling events throughout the 2021 women's cycling season. It was the sixth edition of the UCI Women's World Tour, the ranking system launched by the Union Cycliste Internationale (UCI) in 2016. The competition began with Strade Bianche on 6 March, and finished with the Ronde van Drenthe on 23 October.

Dutch rider Annemiek van Vleuten became the first rider to win the individual classification for a second time, taking a season-high four overall victories during the season, finishing the season with a tally of 3177 points. A total of nine riders won races during the season, while the individual classification lead changed eight times between van Vleuten, Vollering, Longo Borghini, Marianne Vos and Chantal van den Broek-Blaak.

The youth classification was closely-contested with just two points separating the top two riders in the classification. Third place in the standings went to Russia's Maria Novolodskaya, who scored 22 points and one win. A total of eight riders won races during the season, with the classification lead changing six times between Fisher-Black, Muzic, Novolodskaya, Sarah Gigante and Emma Norsgaard Jørgensen.

Events
The race calendar for the 2021 season was announced in July 2020, with twenty-five races initially scheduled – up from twenty-one that were scheduled to be held in 2020. Two Spanish races – the Itzulia Women and the Vuelta a Burgos Feminas – were scheduled to be part of the calendar for the first time. Paris–Roubaix, which featured on the revised 2020 schedule after the suspension of racing due to the COVID-19 pandemic, also returned to the calendar, as did the RideLondon Classique after a year's absence. In September 2020, the Giro d'Italia Femminile was relegated to the 2021 UCI Women's ProSeries, being downgraded to 2.Pro status.

On 1 November 2020, La Course by Le Tour de France was moved forward three weeks from 18 July to 27 June; this was as a result of the route being contested on the second day of the 2021 Tour de France, finishing at the Mûr-de-Bretagne. On 22 February 2021, following the cancellation of the Itzulia Women stage race, race organisers OCETA announced their intention to hold the Donostia San Sebastián Klasikoa at World Tour level, on 31 July. La Course by Le Tour de France was moved forward a further day in April 2021 to 26 June, due to departmental elections to be held in Côtes-d'Armor, and consisted of a route utilising part of the opening stage of the men's race. In July, the Madrid Challenge by La Vuelta was extended from three stages to four, finishing in Santiago de Compostela on the same day as the final stage of the Vuelta a España.

Cancelled and postponed events
On 1 November 2020, the season-opening Cadel Evans Great Ocean Road Race was cancelled due to quarantine and border restriction issues attributed to the COVID-19 pandemic. The organisers of the Ronde van Drenthe announced that they had applied to the Union Cycliste Internationale (UCI) to move the race from the assigned date of 14 March to the last weekend of October. In January 2021, both the Itzulia Women and the RideLondon Classique were cancelled as a consequence of the COVID-19 pandemic. The following month, The Women's Tour was postponed from its initial June dates due to the COVID-19 pandemic, requesting a date change to October. In March, the Tour of Chongming Island was postponed from its scheduled dates in May. On 18 March 2021, it was confirmed that The Women's Tour, the Tour of Chongming Island and the Ronde van Drenthe would all be held in October. On 1 April 2021, Paris–Roubaix was postponed to 2 October, following a surge in cases due to the COVID-19 pandemic in France. In May, the Open de Suède Vårgårda races were cancelled due to financial issues associated with the COVID-19 pandemic in Sweden. In August, the Tour of Chongming Island and the Tour of Guangxi were both cancelled at the request of their respective organisers, due to the COVID-19 pandemic.

Points standings
For the 2021 season, the point-scoring system introduced in 2020 by the Union Cycliste Internationale remained in place.

Individual
Riders tied with the same number of points were classified by number of victories, then number of second places, third places, and so on, in World Tour events and stages.

Youth
The top three riders in the final results of each World Tour event's young rider classification received points towards the standings. Six points were awarded to first place, four points to second place and two points to third place.

Team
Team rankings were calculated by adding the ranking points of all the riders of a team in the table.

Notes

References

External links

 
UCI
UCI
UCI Women's World Tour